Seguenzia conopia is a species of extremely small deep water sea snail, a marine gastropod mollusk in the family Seguenziidae.

Description
The height of this translucent, nacreous, white shell attains 3.7 mm.

Distribution
This marine species occurs off New Zealand in the Tasman Basin at a depth of about 1,800 m.

References

conopia
Gastropods described in 1983